The Mixed parallel slalom team competition at the FIS Freestyle Ski and Snowboarding World Championships 2023 was held on 22 February 2023.

Participants
Start order: Male, female

Results

References

Mixed parallel slalom team